Mirza Taghi Khan Raf'at was the son of Agha Mohammad Tabrizi. He was educated in Istanbul and during World War I returned to Tabriz to teach French in high school. He was a modernist poet who wrote in Turkish and French as well as Persian. Politically, he was a follower of Mohammad Khiabani, and edited the latter's newspaper, Tajaddod ("Modernity"), an organ of the Democratic Party of Azerbaijan, as well as the magazine Azadistan. When Khiabani's movement was violently crushed, Rafat committed suicide in a small village near Tabriz.

His arguments with Malek-osh-Sho'arā Bahār, a traditionalist poet and the chief of all poets of Iran (a high conceptual title given to the oldest and wisest poet in the country by the royal court of Persia which entitled the Malekoshoara to receive pensions from the court and to moderate and govern the cultural activities of all other poets in Persia), are famous. he was a reformist with a hot tongue who criticized the old ways of literature in Iran and was pushing for reforms in both form and content in order to revolutionize the core of Persian Literature, especially in poetry.

See also 
 Ismail Amirkhizi

References

Further reading 
 
 

20th-century Iranian poets
Persian-language poets
1880s births
Year of birth uncertain
1920 suicides
Poets from Tabriz
Suicides in Iran
19th-century Iranian poets